Judy May Cornell (March 28, 1933 – January 4, 2021) was an American competition swimmer who represented the United States at the 1952 Summer Olympics in Helsinki, Finland.  Cornell competed in the preliminary heats of the women's 200-meter breaststroke. Cornell died on January 4, 2021, at the age of 87.

References

1933 births
2021 deaths
American female breaststroke swimmers
Olympic swimmers of the United States
Swimmers from Portland, Oregon
Swimmers at the 1952 Summer Olympics
21st-century American women